The Committee of Seventy was a committee of 70 citizens of New York City, formed in 1871 and under the lead of Samuel J. Tilden, which conducted an investigation and prosecution of misuse of government office by William M. Tweed.

Foundation
In the summer of 1871, proofs were furnished that enormous frauds had been perpetrated by the existing officials upon the New York City treasury, raising the city debt in 2½ years from $50,000,000 to $113,000,000.  One of the chief instruments of peculation was the court house, large sums appropriated for its construction finding their way into the pockets of the “ring.” The amount ostensibly expended in its erection exceeded $12,000,000.

People were immediately aroused, and assembled in mass meeting in the Cooper Union on September 4, 1871, when a committee of 70 members was appointed, to take the necessary measures to ascertain the true state of the treasury, to recover any abstracted moneys, and to secure good government and honest officers.

In the November 1871 city election, the candidates favored by the people accused in the frauds were defeated by large majorities. The accused were subsequently prosecuted. Some of them were convicted and sentenced, while others fled the country. Several of the judges were impeached and resigned, or were removed from office.

Later Committee of Seventy
Another Committee of Seventy was formed in the aftermath of the Lexow Committee of 1894, where Richard Croker's operation of Tammany Hall and the police force were under investigation.

Members
 Henry G. Stebbins - Chairman
 William Frederick Havemeyer - Vice-Chairman
 Roswell D. Hatch - Secretary
 Emil Sauer - Treasurer
 George C. Barrett
 Jackson S. Schultz
 James Emott
 W. H. Neilson
 Isaac H. Bailey
 D. Willis James
 James M. Brown
 Henry Clews
 H. F. Spaulding
 Geo. W. Lane
 W. R. Vermilye
 E. Townsend
 Lewis Ballard
 Severn D. Moulton
 James M. Halsted
 J. B. Varnum
 Robert Hoe
 John Wheeler (New York politician)
 H. N. Beers
 Samuel Christie
 Thomas A. Ledwith
 Joseph Blumenthal
 John Adams Dix
 Geo. W. Varian
 J. J. O'Donohue
 Ed. Cooper
 Eugene Ballin
 William M. Evarts
 Julius W. Tieman
 Reuben W. Howes
 W. C. Barrett
 Albert Klamroth
 Frederick Schack
 John A. Stewart
 James B. Hodgskin
 B. B. Sherman
 C. E. Detmold
 Charles Crary
 Sam. D. Babcock
 Edwards Pierrepont
 Joseph Hodges Choate
 John Foley
 John Straiton
 Thomas McLelland
 J. M. Budny
 Henry Nicoll (politician)
 E. Krackouitzer
 Adrian Iselin
 Johnathan Sturges
 Theo. Steinway
 John Ewen
 John Cleve Green
 William H. Wickham
 Charles Watrous
 Simon Stern
 Robert Roosevelt
 Geo. W. Van Slyck
 William. C. Molloy
 N. G. Dunn
 T. C. Cunningham
 S. B. Ruggles
 Robert B. Nooney
 Francis C. Barlow
 Thomas W. Piersall
 William M. Fliess
 Joseph Seligman
 William Radde
 Edmund R. Robinson

Notes

References
 

Organizations established in 1871
1871 establishments in New York (state)
Organizations based in New York (state)